Leucine-rich repeat, immunoglobulin-like and transmembrane domains 3 is a protein that in humans is encoded by the LRIT3 gene.

References

Further reading